Sid Ramnarace is a Canadian-born American designer and strategist who has worked  with the Ford Motor Company, in Dearborn, Michigan, United States, and has designed automobiles, furniture, jewelry, textiles, glassware, and home decor.

Background

At the age of 12, he submitted letters to Chuck Jordan at General Motors and Jack Telnack at Ford in the hope of receiving advice to landing a job as a designer. Based on the reply from those letters, Ramnarace studied at the Cleveland Institute of Art, where he graduated with a degree in industrial design, studying under the tutelage of design pioneer, Viktor Schreckengost.

Career

After a brief stint at General Motors as a contract designer, Ramnarace began at Ford working at Ford's Global Design Center and developed textiles, color and trim for the Ford Explorer, Ford Prodigy and 24.7 show car concepts, where he worked under VP of Design J Mays and Chief Designer Laurens van den Acker.

He has contributed to automobile interiors and exteriors including the Ford Edge and Lincoln MKX, Ford Flex, Ford Thunderbird and most notably, the 5th generation Ford Mustang which was cited as one of the most iconic cars of the last 20 years.

Sid has also spent time teaching at his alma mater as well as appearing as a guest speaker at the University of Michigan Ross School of Business at the MBA in Marketing program.

Criticism

The clean design of the 24.7 featured simple geometric shapes and machined surfaces which were designed to communicate a technical look and feel, complimenting the prescient advanced communication and telematic technologies that made up the essence of 24.7. However, the design of the 24.7 was criticized in the press - The Car Connection was quoted saying, "It's wrapped around the Internet because the Internet is trendy, and in the design-led world Ford is entering under J Mays guidance, trendy is everything."

Selected projects

References

External links
 Core 77 Interview with Sid Ramnarace Q+A with Sid Ramnarace at the International Home and Housewares Show
 Car and Driver Car and Driver feature on Ramnarace designs

Canadian furniture designers
Living people
American automobile designers
Ford designers
People in the automobile industry
1973 births
Canadian jewellery designers